Río Grande is a city in Argentina, on the north coast of the eastern part of the Isla Grande de Tierra del Fuego. It has a population of 67,038, and is the industrial capital of the Tierra del Fuego Province.

It is served by Hermes Quijada International Airport.

History

Sheep farming, as many other places in Patagonia, was the main impetus for population settlements beginning in the late 19th century.

Abundant rivers, the seacoast, and good pastures were some of the reasons that fueled population growth. Río Grande was founded on July 11, 1921, when the central government issued a decree recognising this locality as the "Agricultural Colony of Río Grande".

In the beginning, the land was subdivided among a few families, owning large estates until the agrarian reform of 1925. Cattle raising became one of the most important economic activities in the area.

In 2014, the city came into international scrutiny after a mob of some 300 vehicles blocked the escape of the support staff for the BBC Television program Top Gear after they had already been attacked with eggs and stones in Tolhuin, on a protest that started after their car plate resembled the Falkland Islands dispute. Arriving at the river border crossing, the crew had to illegally cross the border with Chile, after the crew was temporarily expelled from the province, which their crossing was successful.

Economy 

In order to promote industrial development, Tierra del Fuego is excluded from VAT and federal income tax. As a result, several manufacturing companies, particularly those involving electronic products, have opened factories in this city. 

The city's population has grown rapidly since 1980. Many people have relocated from the northern parts of Argentina and from other countries, such as Bolivia, to work in factories that offer higher wages than other provinces of Argentina and also as a result of the television set production and assembly plants opened notably by ITT.

One of the most rapidly growing sectors is the production of laptops and netbooks. These products were totally imported until 2006 but by 2010, and due to initiatives under the Kirchner administrations, 42% of the Argentine market for these goods was supplied by firms established in Río Grande and Vicente López. 

In April 2011, portfolio investments announced that they were planning to produce over 6.9 million units made in Tierra del Fuego Province, principally in Río Grande, which means more than a half of the sold netbooks in the country.

Climate

Rio Grande's climate is strongly influenced by the ocean: generally quite cool, and sometimes very windy. It has a subantarctic climate (Köppen Dfc; very rare for the Southern Hemisphere) or a subpolar oceanic climate (Köppen Cfc) depending on the isotherm used, with cool temperatures year round. 
It also closely borders on a cold semi-arid climate (Köppen BSk) and a tundra climate (Köppen ET). Temperatures in the warmest months, January and February average  while temperatures in the coolest month average . Also, due to its latitude, the length of the day varies tremendously across the year. Winter days can have as few as seven hours of sunlight, while summer days stretch to seventeen hours.
Frost occurs throughout the year, and winter temperatures can remain below freezing for relatively long periods of time. As such, the frost free period is very short with the first date of frost being February 23 and the last date of frost being November 22. During the summer, conditions are generally very windy and cloudy, and nights remain cold. Freak snowfalls can occur even in midsummer. It is believed that this is the southernmost recorded instance where temperatures exceed .

Gallery

See also

 Ushuaia

References

Notes

External links
 Government website 

Populated places in Tierra del Fuego Province, Argentina
Cities and towns in Tierra del Fuego
Populated coastal places in Argentina
Populated places established in 1921
1921 establishments in Argentina
Cities in Argentina
Argentina
Tierra del Fuego Province, Argentina